Dean Reynolds (born 11 January 1963 in Grimsby) is an English former professional snooker player whose career spanned twenty years from 1981 to 2001.

Career
Before turning professional, Reynolds won the first-ever Junior Pot Black in 1981, beating Dene O'Kane, another future professional, with a 2- aggregate score of 151–79.

He twice reached a ranking tournament final, but lost both times, in the 1989 British Open to Tony Meo  and in the 1989 Grand Prix to Steve Davis.

Reynolds is one of the select band of players who have compiled a sixteen- clearance (143 ) in competition at the 2006 European Team Championships in Carlow.

In April 2009 Reynolds suffered a stroke and had to relearn his snooker technique.

Performance and rankings timeline

Career finals

Ranking finals: 2

Non-ranking finals: 3 (2 titles)

Amateur finals: 1 (1 title)

References

1963 births
Living people
English snooker players
Sportspeople from Grimsby